Sebastianus (died 413) was a Roman noble and usurping emperor.

Other notable people named Sebastianus include:

Sebastianus (magister peditum) (died 378), a Roman military leader
Sebastianus (magister militum) (died before 445 or in 450), a Roman military leader

See also
Sebastian (disambiguation)
Sebastiani (disambiguation)